A list of films produced in Egypt in 1972. For an A-Z list of films currently on Wikipedia, see :Category:Egyptian films.

External links
 Egyptian films of 1972 at the Internet Movie Database
 Egyptian films of 1972 elCinema.com

Lists of Egyptian films by year
1972 in Egypt
Lists of 1972 films by country or language